Nema promene is the thirteenth studio album by Serbian singer Dragana Mirković. It was released in 1996.

Track listing
Nema promene
Dušu si mi opio
Kaži zbogom
Brate moj
Navikao si mali moj
Tebi ljubavi
Zagrli me majko
Na rastanku
To nije tvoja stvar
Idi s' njom
Jedno za drugo
Za tvoju ljubav
Oči pune tuge (featuring Željko Šašić)

References

1996 albums
Dragana Mirković albums